This list of archaeological sites beyond national boundaries presents archaeological sites that are not in any country.  This includes sites in international waters and international territories such as Antarctica and extraterrestrial sites.

See also 

 Space archaeology

References